Kushk (also Romanized as Kūshk) is a city in the Central District of Khomeyni Shahr County, Isfahan Province, Iran. At the 2006 census, its population was 11,264, in 3,083 families.

References

Populated places in Khomeyni Shahr County
Cities in Isfahan Province